This is a list of aircraft in alphabetical order beginning with 'Pi - Pz'.

Pi - Pz

Piaggio 
(Societa Anonima Piaggio / Industrie Aeronautiche e Meccaniche Rinaldo Piaggio SpA)

 Piaggo-D'Ascanio helicopter
 Piaggio P.2
 Piaggio P.3
 Piaggio P.6
 Piaggio P.7
 Piaggio P.8
 Piaggio P.9
 Piaggio P.10
 Piaggio P.11
 Piaggio P.12
 Piaggio P.16
 Piaggio P.23
 Piaggio P.23R
 Piaggio P.32
 Piaggio P.50
 Piaggio P.108
 Piaggio P.111
 Piaggio P.119
 Piaggio P.127
 Piaggio P.133
 Piaggio P.136
 Piaggio P.148
 Piaggio P.149
 Piaggio P.150
 Piaggio P.155
 Piaggio P.166 Albatross
 Piaggio P.180 Avanti
 Piaggio PD.1  (Ing. Corradino D'Ascanio at Piaggio)
 Piaggio PD.2  (Ing. Corradino D'Ascanio at Piaggio)
 Piaggio PD.3  (Ing. Corradino D'Ascanio at Piaggio)
 Piaggio PD.4  (Ing. Corradino D'Ascanio at Piaggio)
 Piaggio PD.808

Piasecki 
((Frank N) Piasecki Helicopter Corp, Morton, PA)
 Piasecki H-16 Transporter
 Piasecki H-21 Shawnee
 Piasecki H-25 Army Mule
 Piasecki H-27
 Piasecki HJP
 Piasecki HRP Rescuer
 Piasecki HUP Retriever
 Piasecki R-16 Transporter
 Piasecki VZ-8 Airgeep
 Piasecki X-49A
 Piasecki 16H Pathfinder
 Piasecki PA-2B
 Piasecki PA-4 Seabat
 Piasecki PA-39
 Piasecki PA-59
 Piasecki PA-97 Helistat
 Piasecki PD-22
 Piasecki PV-1
 Piasecki PV-2
 Piasecki PV-3
 Piasecki PV-14
 Piasecki PV-15
 Piasecki PV-17
 Piasecki PV-18

Piccard
(Bertrand Piccard)
 Piccard Eureka

Piccard-Borschberg 
 Piccard-Borschberg Solar Impulse

Picken 
(H B Picken Co, Hamilton, OH)
 Picken Helicon

Pickering-Pearson
Pickering-Pearson KP.2

Piel 
(Claude Piel)
 Piel CP.10 Pinocchio
 Piel CP.20 Pinocchio I
 Piel CP.40 Donald
 Piel CP.402
 Piel CP.41
 Piel CP.100
 Piel CP.140
 Piel CP.500
 Piel Beryl
 Piel Diamant
 Piel Emeraude
 Piel Emeraude Club
 Piel Smaragd
 Piel Super Diamant
 Piel Super Emeraude
 Piel Pinocchio II
 Piel Saphir
 Piel Onyx
 Piel Zephir

Pietenpol 
 Pietenpol Gnome Biplane
 Pietenpol Model T Biplane
 Pietenpol Air Camper
 Pietenpol Sky Scout

Pigeon 
(Henry Pigeon Mast & Spar Co, Boston, MA 1900: Pigeon Hollow Spar Co, 131 Coleridge St, Boston, MA)
 Pigeon Scout
 Pigeon Flying Boat

PIK
(Polyteknikkojen Ilmailukerho - Finnish institute of technology flying club)
PIK-1 
PIK-2 primary glider
PIK-3a Kanttikolmonen
PIK-3c Kajava
PIK-4 primary glider
PIK-5 Cumulus variants b, c
PIK-6
PIK-7 Harakka primary glider
PIK-10 Motorbaby
PIK-11 Tumppu
PIK-12
PIK-13
PIK-14
PIK-15 Hinu
PIK-16 Vasama
PIK-17a Tumppi
PIK-17b Tintti
PIK-19
PIK-20 Tiu variants A, B, D, E
PIK-21 Super Sytky
PIK-22
PIK-23 Towmaster
PIK-24 Pileus motorglider
PIK-26
PIK-25 Varttimarkka First flight on 21/6/2007
PIK-27 Sehinu glider tug
PIK-30 motorglider

Pilatus 
 Pilatus B-4
 Pilatus P-1
 Pilatus P-2
 Pilatus P-3
 Pilatus P-4
 Pilatus P-5
 Pilatus PC-6 Porter and Turbo Porter
 Pilatus PC-7
 Pilatus PC-7 Mk.II
 Pilatus PC-9
 Pilatus PC-10
 Pilatus PC-11/Pilatus B-4
 Pilatus PC-12
 Pilatus PC-12 NG
 Pilatus PC-21
 Pilatus PC-24
 Pilatus SB-2 Pelican
 Pilatus U-28A

Pilgrim 
(American Airplane & Engine Corp (Fairchild), Farmingdale, NY)
 Pilgrim 100
 Pilgrim C-24
 Pilgrim FC-2
 Pilgrim KR-34
 Pilgrim KR-135

Pilots Right Stuff
(Brannenburg, Germany)
PRS One
PRS Peak
PRS Pilot One

Pinaire
Pinaire Ultra-Aire

Pine 
 Pine Super "V" Bonanza

Pintsch
(Austria)
 Pintsch Schwalbe

Pioneer 
(American Aeronautical Corporation, New York, NY)
 Pioneer 1933 Biplane

Piper 
(also, The New Piper Aircraft, Inc - 1995–2005; Piper Aircraft, Inc - 2005 to current)
 Piper AE
 Piper C-83
 Piper HE
 Piper L-4
 Piper L-14
 Piper L-18
 Piper L-21
 Piper L-59
 Piper LBP
 Piper LNP
 Piper O-59 Grasshopper
 Piper PT-1
 Piper U-7
 Piper U-11
 Piper UO
 Piper J-2 Cub
 Piper J-3 Cub
 Piper J-4 Cub Coupe
 Piper J-5 Cub Cruiser
 Piper M350
 Piper NE
 Piper P-1
 Piper P-2
 Piper P-4
 Piper PA-6 Sky Sedan
 Piper PA-7 Sky Coupe a.k.a. PWA-1
 Piper PA-8 Sky cycle
 Piper PA-11 Cub Special
 Piper PA-12 Super Cruiser
 Piper PA-14 Family Cruiser
 Piper PA-15 Vagabond
 Piper PA-16 Clipper
 Piper PA-17 Vagabond Deluxe
 Piper PA-18 Super Cub
 Piper PA-19
 Piper PA-20 Pacer
 Piper PA-21
 Piper PA-22 Caribbean
 Piper PA-22 Colt
 Piper PA-22 Tri-Pacer
 Piper PA-23 Apache
 Piper PA-23 Aztec
 Piper PA-24 Comanche
 Piper PA-25 Pawnee
 Piper PA-28 Arrow
 Piper PA-28 Archer
 Piper PA-28 Cadet
 Piper PA-28 Charger
 Piper PA-28 Cherokee
 Piper PA-28 Cherokee Challenger
 Piper PA-28 Warrior
 Piper PA-28 Pathfinder
 Piper PA-28 Dakota
 Piper PA-28 Turbo Dakota
 Piper PA-28R-300 Pilan
 Piper PA-29 Papoose
 Piper PA-30 Twin Comanche
 Piper PA-31 Cheyenne
 Piper PA-31 Chieftain
 Piper PA-31 Mojave
 Piper PA-31 Navajo
 Piper PA-32 Cherokee 6
 Piper PA-32 Lance
 Piper PA-32 Saratoga
 Piper PA-32 Cherokee Arrow
 Piper PA-33 Comanche
 Piper PA-34 Seneca
 Piper PA-35 Pocono
 Piper PA-36 Pawnee II
 Piper PA-36 Pawnee Brave
 Piper PA-38 Tomahawk
 Piper PA-40 Arapaho
 Piper PA-42 Cheyenne
 Piper PA-44 Seminole
 Piper PA-46 Malibu
 Piper PA-46 Mirage
 Piper PA-46 Meridian
 Piper PA-48 Enforcer
 Piper PA-60 Aerostar
 Piper PA-60 Sequoia
 Piper PT-1
 Piper Twin Stinson
 Piper Aerostar

Piper-Marriot 
(William S Piper & E O Marriot, Los Angeles, CA)
 Piper-Marriot 1964 Autogyro

Pipistrel 
(Pipistrel d.o.o Ajdovščina)
 Pipistrel Alpha Trainer
 Pipistrel Apis
 Pipistrel Apis 13
 Pipistrel Apis 15 M
 Pipistrel Panthera
 Pipistrel Sinus
 Pipistrel Spider
 Pipistrel Taurus
 Pipistrel Taurus G4
 Pipistrel Taurus Electro
 Pipistrel Virus
 Pipistrel Virus SW
 Pipistrel WATTsUP
 Pipistrel 801 eVTOL

Pitcairn 
(Pitcairn Aircraft Company)
 Pitcairn O-61
 Pitcairn OP-1 (PCA-2)
 Picairn OP-2 (PA-34)
 Pitcairn MX-157
 Pitcairn PA-1 Fleetwing
 Pitcairn PA-2 Sesquiwing
 Pitcairn PA-3 Orowing
 Pitcairn PA-4 Fleetwing 2
 Pitcairn PA-4 Fleetwing II
 Pitcairn Fleetwing DeLuxe
 Pitcairn PA-4 Fleetwing
 Pitcairn PA-5 Mailwing
 Pitcairn PA-5 Sport Mailwing
 Pitcairn PA-6 Super Mailwing
 Pitcairn PA-7 Super Mailwing
 Pitcairn PA-8 Super Mailwing
 Pitcairn PA-18
 Pitcairn PA-19
 Pitcairn PA-20
 Pitcairn PA-21
 Pitcairn PA-22
 Pitcairn PA-24
 Pitcairn PA-33
 Pitcairn PA-34
 Pitcairn PA-36 Whirl Wing
 Pitcairn PA-39
 Pitcairn PA-44
 Pitcairn PAA-1
 Pitcairn PAA-2
 Pitcairn G-2
 Pitcairn-Cierva C-8
 Pitcairn-Cierva PCA-1
 Pitcairn-Cierva PCA-2
 Pitcairn-Cierva PCA-3
 Pitcairn-Larsen PA-36

Pitt 
(Bruce & Gilbert Pitt, Hales Corners, WI)
 Pitt Yellow Jacket

Pitts 
(John W Pitts and W P Kindree, Detroit, MI)
 Pitts Sky Car

Pitts
(Curtis Pitts)
 Pitts Pellet
 Pitts Samson
 Pitts Special Miss Dayton
 Pitts Special Li'l Monster
 Pitts S1 Special Special
 Pitts S1 Li'l Stinker L'il Stinker
 Pitts S1
 Pitts S2
 Pitts Model 12 Macho Stinker
 Pitts Model 13
 Pitts Model 14

Pivot-Koechlin 
(Pivot et Paul Koechlin)
 Pivot-Koechlin monoplane

Planchais
(Robert Planchais)
 Planchais LD-45-IV

Plane Driven 
(Trey Johnson / Glasair / Stoddard-Hamilton)
 Plane Driven PD-1

Platt 
(Haviland Hull Platt, Philadelphia, PA)
 Platt Cyclogyro

Platt-LePage 
((Haviland Hull) Platt-(Wynn Laurence) LePage Aircraft Co, Eddystone, PA)
 Platt-Le Page PL-3
 Platt-Le Page PL-4
 Platt-Le Page PL-5
 Platt-Le Page PL-8
 Platt-Le Page PL-9
 Platt-Le Page PL-11
 Platt-Le Page PL-12
 Platt-Le Page PL-14
 Platt-Le Page XR-1
 Platt-Le Page XR-1A

Platzer
(Michael Platzer, Ellenberg, Germany)
Platzer Kiebitz
Platzer Motte

Player 
(William Earl Player & Harry Thalman, Salt Lake City, UT)
 Player 1936 Monoplane
 Player CT-6A Plxweve
 Player Sport

Plews 
(J E Plews, Chicago, IL)
 Plews 1910 Biplane

Pliska 
(John V Pliska and Gary Coggin, Midland, TX)
 Pliska 1912 Biplane

Plumb 
(Barry G. Plumb)
 Plumb BGP1 Biplane

Plymouth 
(Plymouth Development Corporation, NY)
 Plymouth A-A-2004

PLV 
(PLV Chicago and Cicero, IL)
 PLV 1915 Biplane

PMBRA 
(Rinji Gunyo Kikyu Kenkyu Kai - Provisional Military Balloon Research Association / 'Rikugun Kosho - Army Arsenals)
 Kaishiki No.1
 PMBRA Kaishiki No.2 Aeroplane
 PMBRA Kaishiki No.3 Aeroplane
 PMBRA Kaishiki No.4 Aeroplane
 PMBRA Kaishiki No.5 Aeroplane
 PMBRA Kaishiki No.6 Aeroplane
 PMBRA Kaishiki No.7 Aeroplane
 PMBRA Kaishiki No.7 Small Aeroplane
 PMBRA Army Type Mo (Maurice Farman Type) 1913 Aeroplane
 PMBRA Converted Type Mo (Maurice Farman Type) Aeroplane
 PMBRA Army Henri Farman Type Model 4 Aeroplane (Army Type Mo-4 Aeroplane)
 PMBRA Army Maurice Farman Type Model 6 Aeroplane (Army Type Mo-6 Aeroplane)
 PMBRA Army Maurice Farman 5 Aeroplane
 PMBRA Seishiki-1 Aeroplane
 PMBRA Seishiki-2 Aeroplane
 PMBRA Standard H-3 Trainer
 PMBRA Army Model 2 Ground Taxi-ing Trainer
 PMBRA Army Model 3 Ground Taxi-ing Trainer
 PMBRA Koshiki-1 Experimental Reconnaissance Aircraft
 PMBRA Koshiki-2 Experimental Fighter
 PMBRA Koshiki A-3 Experimental Long-range Reconnaissance Aircraft
 PMBRA Kaibo Gikai KB Experimental Flying Boat
 PMBRA Army Experimental Model 3 Fighter
 PMBRA Army Experimental Three-seat Light Bomber

Poage 
(Jack Poage, Churchville, MD)
 Poage Eindekker

Poberezny 
(Paul Poberezny, Milwaukee, WI)
 Poberezny P-5 Pober Sport
 Poberezny Pober Acro Sport
 Poberezny Pober Little Audrey
 Poberezny P-9 Pober Pixie
 Poberezny Pober Super Ace

Pocino
(José Pocino)
 Pocino PJ.1A

Podešva
(Podešva Air / Tomáš Podešva)
(Podesva-Vyroba a opravy UL letadel, Ujezd, Czech Republic)
Podesva Trener
Let-Mont UL Tulák
Podesva UL Piper
Podesva Trener Baby

Podge 
 Podge Parasol

Poeschel
(see: Pöschel)

Poite
 Poite 3

Polaris Motor
(Polaris Motor srl, Gubbio, Italy)
Polaris AM-FIB
Polaris FIB
Polaris Skin

Polen 
((Dennis N) Polen Aircraft, Portland, OR)
 Polen Special
 Polen Special II a.k.a. Temptress

Poligrat
(Poligrat-Development GmbH & Co KG)
 Poligrat PD-01 Master-Porter
 Poligrat PC-10 Twin-Porter

Polikarpov 
 Polikarpov 2I-N1
 Polikarpov AO
 Polikarpov AP
 Polikarpov ARK-5
 Polikarpov BDP
 Polikarpov D
 Polikarpov D-2
 Polikarpov DI-1
 Polikarpov DI-2
 Polikarpov E-23
 Polikarpov ED-1
 Polikarpov I-1
 Polikarpov I-3
 Polikarpov I-5
 Polikarpov I-6
 Polikarpov I-7
 Polikarpov I-11
 Polikarpov I-13
 Polikarpov I-15
 Polikarpov I-152
 Polikarpov I-153
 Polikarpov I-16
 Polikarpov I-17
 Polikarpov I-180
 Polikarpov I-185
 Polikarpov I-187
 Polikarpov I-188
 Polikarpov I-190
 Polikarpov I-195
 Polikarpov IL-400
 Polikarpov ITP
 Polikarpov Ivanov
 Polikarpov L-2
 Polikarpov Limuzin
 Polikarpov LPL
 Polikarpov LSh
 Polikarpov Malyutka
 Polikarpov MP
 Polikarpov MPI-1
 Polikarpov MR-5
 Polikarpov MU-2
 Polikarpov NAK
 Polikarpov NB
 Polikarpov ODB
 Polikarpov PAM-11
 Polikarpov PB
 Polikarpov P-2
 Polikarpov P-5
 Polikarpov P-Z
 Polikarpov PM-1
 Polikarpov Po-2
 Polikarpov PR-12
 Polikarpov PT
 Polikarpov R-1
 Polikarpov R-2
 Polikarpov R-4
 Polikarpov R-5
 Polikarpov R-Z
 Polikarpov SKF
 Polikarpov SP
 Polikarpov SPB (I-16) (I-16 fighter-bomber)
 Polikarpov SPB (VIT-1) (VIT-1 variant)
 Polikarpov SPL
 Polikarpov SSS
 Polikarpov SVB
 Polikarpov TB-2
 Polikarpov TIS
 Polikarpov TPK
 Polikarpov U-2
 Polikarpov UTI-1
 Polikarpov UTI-2
 Polikarpov UTI-3
 Polikarpov UTI-4
 Polikarpov VIT-1
 Polikarpov VIT-2
 Polikarpov VP,K
 Polikarpov VT-11
 Polikarpov-Rafaelyants PR-5

Polish Miscellaneous constructors 
 Borucki 1909 Monoplane
 Borucki 1909 Biplane
 Świeściak Polonia

Politecnico 
 Politecnico P-110

Polliwagen 
(Polliwagen Inc (Pres: Joseph P Alvarez), Garden Grove, CA)
 Polliwagen 1977 Monoplane

Polson 
(Thor (Thomas) Polson, Long Beach, CA)
 Polson Special

Polyteknisk Flyvegruppe 
(Polyteknisk Flyvegruppe - Flying Group of the Technical University of Denmark)
 Polyt V

Pomilio
(Fabbrica Aeroplani Ing. O. Pomilio)
 Pomilio PC
 Pomilio PD
 Pomilio PE
 Pomilio Gamma

Poncelet 
(Paul Poncelet)
 Poncelet Castar - 1923 motorised glider
 Poncelet Vivette
 Poncelet Salmson 40HP

Ponche et Primard
(Charles Ponche et Maurice Primard)
 Ponche et Primard Tubavion

Ponnier
(Avions Ponnier - Louis Alfred Ponnier)
 Ponnier 1913 racing monoplane
 Ponnier touring monoplane
 Ponnier 2-seat monoplane
 Ponnier biplane
 Ponnier armoured reconnaissance aircraft (D.8?)
 Ponnier 1916 pusher biplane
 Ponnier D.III (160hp Gnome racer)
 Ponnier D.8
 Ponnier L.1
 Ponnier M.1
 Ponnier M.2
 Ponnier P.I

Pontius 
(John Pontius)
 Pontius 1953 Monoplane
 Pontius Model II

Pop's Props
(Cooksville, IL)
Pop's Props Cloudster
Pop's Props Pinocchio
Pop's Props Zing

Pope 
(Leon Pope, Plymouth, MI)
 Pope Thunderbird P-2

Popejoy 
(Edward Popejoy, Browns Valley, CA)
 Popejoy 1980 Monoplane

Popov 
(C.B. Popov)
 Popov Baikal-2

Porokhovshchikov 
(Aleksandr Aleksandrovich Porokhovshchikov)
 Porokhovshchikov No.1
 Porokhovshchikov No.2 Bi-kok
 Porokhovshchikov P-IV
 Porokhovshchikov P-IVbis
 Porokhovshchikov P-IV 2bis
 Porokhovshchikov P-V
 Porokhovshchikov No.1
 Porokhovshchikov P-VI

Port Victoria 
 Port Victoria P.V.2
 Port Victoria P.V.4
 Port Victoria P.V.5
 Port Victoria P.V.5bis
 Port Victoria P.V.7
 Port Victoria P.V.8
 Port Victoria P.V.9
 Port Victoria Grain Griffin

Porterfield 
(Porterfield Aircraft Corp, 1328 Locust St, Kansas City, MO)
 Porterfield 35-70 Flyabout
 Porterfield 35-V
 Porterfield 35-W
 Porterfield 75-C
 Porterfield 90
 Porterfield CP-40 Zephyr
 Porterfield CP-50 Collegiate
 Porterfield CP-65 Collegiate
 Porterfield FP-50 Collegiate
 Porterfield FP-60 Collegiate
 Porterfield FP-65 Collegiate
 Porterfield LP-50 Collegiate
 Porterfield LP-55 Collegiate
 Porterfield LP-65 Collegiate
 Porterfield-Turner PT-25
 Porterfield 145

Portsmouth Aviation 
Portsmouth Aerocar

Posadas 
(J Zenon Posadas Jr, San Francisco, CA)
 Posadas 1908 Biplane

Pöschel 
(Pöschel Aircraft GmbH)
 Pöschel P-300 Equator

Post & Neudorf / Post, Org & Neudorf / Post, Org, Neudorf / Post Tooma & Org 
See:ÕGL

Potez 
Data from: 

 Potez IV
 Potez VII
 Potez VIII
 Potez VIIIA
 Potez VIIIH
 Potez VIIIR
 Potez IX
 Potez X
 Potez XI
 Potez XII
 Potez XV
 Potez XVII
 Potez XVIII
 Potez XIX
 Potez XXII
 Potez 23
 Potez 24
 Potez 25
 Potez 26
 Potez 27
 Potez 28
 Potez 29
 Potez 31
 Potez 32
 Potez 33
 Potez 34
 Potez 35
 Potez 36
 Potez 37
 Potez 38
 Potez 39
 Potez 390
 Potez 391
 Potez 392
 Potez 393
 Potez 40
 Potez 400
 Potez 42
 Potez 43
 Potez 430
 Potez 431
 Potez 432
 Potez 434
 Potez 435
 Potez 437
 Potez 438
 Potez 439
 Potez 450
 Potez 452
 Potez 453
 Potez 49
 Potez 50
 Potez 501
 Potez 506
 Potez 53
 Potez 532
 Potez 533
 Potez 54
 Potez 540
 Potez 541
 Potez 542
 Potez 543
 Potez 56E
 Potez 560
 Potez 566
 Potez 567
 Potez 568
 Potez 58
 Potez 580
 Potez 582
 Potez 584
 Potez 585
 Potez 586
 Potez 60
 Potez 62
 Potez 621
 Potez 630
 Potez 631
 Potez 633
 Potez 637
 Potez 63-11
 Potez 650
 Potez 660
 Potez 661
 Potez 662
 Potez 670
 Potez 671
 Potez 75
 Potez 220
 Potez 230
 Potez 840
 Potez 841
 Potez 842
 Potez 91
 Potez 94
 Potez CM-173 Super Magister
 Potez CXP1 
 Potez HXP1

Potez-CAMS
 Potez-CAMS 80
 Potez-CAMS 90
 Potez-CAMS 110 
 Potez-CAMS 120 
 Potez-CAMS 140
 Potez-CAMS 141
 Potez-CAMS 160
 Potez-CAMS 161

Potez-Heinkel
 Potez-Heinkel CM.191

Pottier
 Pottier P.30 Petrel
 Pottier P.40
 Pottier P.50 Bouvereuil
 Pottier P.60 Minacro
 Pottier P.70
 Pottier P.80
 Pottier P.100
 Pottier P.105TS
 Pottier P.110TS
 Pottier P.130 Coccinelle
 Pottier P.170S
 Pottier P.180S
 Pottier P.210S Coati
 Pottier P.220S Koala
 Pottier P.230S Panda
 Pottier P.240S Saiga
 Pottier P.250S Xerus
 Pottier P.270S Amster
 Pottier P.320
 Jacquet-Pottier JP-20-90 Impala

Potts 
(John Potts, Winchester, OH)
 Potts 1910 Biplane Helicopter

Potts 
(Potts Bros, Dodge City, KS)
 Potts PB-1

Poullin
(Jean Poullin)
 Poullin J.5A
 Poullin J.5B
 Poullin JP.20 Globe Trotter
 Poullin JP.30

Powell 
(Prof C H Powell, et al., University of Detroit, MI)
  Powell PH Racer

Powell 
(John C Powell, Middletown, RI)
  Powell P-70 Acey Deucy

Powers 
(George W Powers, Des Moines, IA)
 Powers 1927 Biplane

Powers-Bashforth 
(Powers-Bashforth Aircraft Corp (Pres: Harry Powers), Arlington, WA)
 Powers-Bashforth Mini Master 2+2 MM-100

Pownall 
(Ivan E Pownall, Grand Rapids MI)
 Pownall EK

Powrachute 

 Airwolf
 Pegasus
 Sky Rascal

Praga 
(Českomoravska-Kolsen-Danek)
 Praga E-I
 Praga E-36
 Praga E-39
 Praga E-40
 Praga E-41
 Praga E-44
 Praga E-45
 Praga E-51
 Praga E-55
 Praga E-114 Air Baby
 Praga E-115
 Praga E-117
 Praga E-141
 Praga E-210
 Praga E-211
 Praga E-212
 Praga E-214
 Praga E-241
 Praga BH-39
 Praga BH-41
 Praga BH-111
 Praga LC-III 
 Praga LC-P-3

Pratt 
(Gordon G Pratt, Tucson, AZ)
 Pratt Snoopy

Preceptor 
 Preceptor N3 Pup
 Preceptor Stinger
 Preceptor STOL King
 Preceptor Super Pup
 Preceptor Ultra Pup

Precision Tech 
 Precision Tech Fergy

Prescott 
(Prescott Aeronautical Corp. Wichita, KS)
 Prescott Pusher

Prest 
((Clarence O) Prest Airplane Supply, Arlington, CA)
 Prest Baby Pursuit

Preti 
(Dr. Ing. Ermenegildo Preti)
 Preti PR.2 Saltofossi (Ditchhopper)
 Preti PM.280 Tartuca

Price 
(Paul Price, Pontiac, IL, 19??: Warren, OH)
 Price Special
 Price PL-2-DM

Priesel
(Guido Priesel)
Priesel No.1 aircraft
Priesel No.2 aircraft
Priesel No.3 aircraft
Priesel KEP (KEP - KampfEinsitzer Priesel)

Přikryl-Blecha
(PÁNOVÉ PŘIKRYL & BLECHA)
 Přikryl-Blecha PB-1
 Přikryl-Blecha PB-4 Racek
 Přikryl-Blecha PB-5 Racek
 Přikryl-Blecha PB-6 Racek

Pringle 
(Frank L Pringle, Everton, MO)
 Pringle 1937 Monoplane

Privateer Industries
(Florida, United States)
Privateer Industries Privateer

Pro FE 
 Pro FE D-7 Mini Straton
 Pro FE D-8 Moby Dick
 Pro FE D-8 Straton
 Pro FE D-10 Tukan

Pro.Mecc
(Pro.Mecc S.r.l., Corigliano d'Otranto, Italy)
Pro.Mecc Freccia Anemo
Pro.Mecc Sparviero

Pro-Composites 
 Pro-Composites Personal Cruiser
 Pro-Composites Freedom
 Pro-Composites Vision

Procaer 
(Progetti Costruzioni Aeronaitiche Srl)
 Procaer F.15 Picchio
 Procaer Cobra

Procter 
 Procter Kittiwake
 Procter Petrel

Pro-Design
(Innsbruck, Austria)
Pro-Design Accura
Pro-Design Amiga
Pro-Design Aquila
Pro-Design Burst
Pro-Design Corrado
Pro-Design Carrier
Pro-Design Challenger
Pro-Design Combi-Cut
Pro-Design Compact
Pro-Design Companion
Pro-Design Contest
Pro-Design Eole
Pro-Design Cuga
Pro-Design Effect
Pro-Design Fly
Pro-Design High
Pro-Design Jalpa
Pro-Design Jazz
Pro-Design Kestral
Pro-Design Lamna
Pro-Design Max
Pro-Design Monster
Pro-Design Pro-Feel
Pro-Design Pro-Ject
Pro-Design Relax
Pro-Design Rrow
Pro-Design Thema
Pro-Design Thermik
Pro-Design Thesis
Pro-Design Titan
Pro-Design X-Fire

Progress 
(Progress Aero R&D Inc)
 Progress Discovery

Progressive Aerodyne 
 Progressive Aerodyne SeaRey
 Progressive Aerodyne Stingray

Prohinsie 
(Royal Aircraft Factory (Fdr: Charles A Prohinsie), Roosevelt Field, Garden City, NY)
 Prohinsie Sesquiplane

Promavia
(Promavia SA)
 Promavia F.1300 Jet Squalus
 Promavia ATTA 3000
 Promavia ARA 3600

Pro Sport Aviation
(Wingate, NC)
Freebird I
Freebird II

Prostar 
(Prostar Aircraft Inc, Beeville, TX)
 Prostar PT-2C

ProTech 
(ProTech Aircraft Inc, Houston, TX)
 ProTech PT-2 Sassy

Protoplane
(Bagnères-de-Bigorre, France)
Protoplane Ultra

Proust & Mas
(Christian Proust & Mas)
 Proust-Mas Scorpion
 Proust-Sigur-Lespace Scorpion

Prowler
(Prowler Aviation Inc, Soquel, CA)
 Prowler Jaguar
 Prowler Morse 364P Prowler

Prudden 
((George H) Prudden Airplane Co, San Diego, CA / Prudden-Whitehead / Atlanta Aircraft Corporation - George H Prudden, Edward Whitehead at Atlanta GA.)
 Prudden 1910 biplane
 Prudden XM-1
 Prudden TM-1
 Solar SE-1 Special
 Prudden-Whitehead monoplane
 Atlanta PW-1
 Atlanta PW-2
 Prudden monoplane

Pruett
(John D Pruett, Crosby, MO)
 Pruett-Curtiss Pusher

PSD Technology Company 
 PSD-09 ekranoplan

PSE 
(Pacific School of Engineering, Portland, OR)
 PSE Racer

PSFA
(Prva srpska Fabrika Aeroplana)
 PSFA reconnaissance aircraft

Puget
(Puget Pacific Planes Inc.)
 Puget Wheelair III

Puget-Pacific 
(Tacoma WA)
 Puget-Pacific Wheelair III-A
 Puget-Pacific Wheelair III-B

Pujol-Comabella
(Pujol, Comabella y Cía, later Loring, Pujol y Cía)
 Pujol-Comabella España

Pulliam 
(Charles Pulliam, Tulsa, OK)
 Pulliam CS-1

Pulsar 
(Pulsar Aircraft Corp, El Monte, CA)
 Pulsar K150
 Pulsar SP100
 Pulsar Super Cruiser
 Pulsar XP/III

Puma Aircraft
(BDC Aero Industrie, Lachute, Quebec, Canada)
BDC Aero Puma

Purcell 
(John D Purcell, Chattanooga, TN)
 Purcell 1908 Biplane

Purcell 
(Sam Purcell, San Rafael and San Francisco, CA)
 Purcell 1913 Twin
 Purcell 1916 Biplane
 Purcell 1917 Cabin

Purcell 
(Russell A Purcell, Rock Island, IL)
 Purcell 1928 Biplane

Puritan 
(Puritan Aircraft Co, Weston, MA)
 Puritan 1939 Monoplane

Purvis-Wilson 
(Goodland Aviation Co (William J Purvis, Charles A Wilson), Goodland, KS)
 Purvis-Wilson 1910 Helicopter

Pützer 
(Alfons Pützer KG)
 Pützer Doppelraab
 Pützer Elster
 Pützer Motorraab
 Pützer SR.57 Bussard - :de:Pützer Bussard
 Pützer MS.60
 Pützer MS.75

P.W.S.
(Podlaska Wytwórnia Samolotów)
 P.W.S.A
 P.W.S.1
 P.W.S.3
 P.W.S.4
 P.W.S.5
 P.W.S.6
 P.W.S.7
 P.W.S.8
 P.W.S.10
 P.W.S.11
 P.W.S.12
 P.W.S.14
 P.W.S.15
 P.W.S.16
 P.W.S.18
 P.W.S.19
 P.W.S.20
 P.W.S.21bis
 P.W.S.22 & P.W.S.23
 P.W.S.24
 P.W.S.26
 P.W.S.33 Wyżeł
 P.W.S.35Ogar
 P.W.S.36
 P.W.S.37
 P.W.S.40
 P.W.S.41
 P.W.S.42 Sokol
 P.W.S.49
 P.W.S.50
 P.W.S.51
 P.W.S.52
 P.W.S.54
 P.W.S.101
 P.W.S.102
 P.W.S.103
 StemalVII
 P.W.S. Sep series
 P.W.S. Ciolkosz bomber project (P.W.S.46?)
 P.W.S. Seaplane

P.Z.L.
(Państwowe Zakłady Lotnicze - State Aviation Works)

P.Z.L. (1928-1939)
 P.Z.L. P.1
 PZL Ł.2
 P.Z.L.3
 P.Z.L.4
 P.Z.L.5
 P.Z.L. P.6
 P.Z.L. P.7
 P.Z.L. P.8
 P.Z.L. P.9
 P.Z.L. P.11
 P.Z.L.12
 P.Z.L.16
 P.Z.L.18
 P.Z.L.19
 P.Z.L.22
 P.Z.L. P.23 Karaś
 P.Z.L. P.24
 P.Z.L.26
 P.Z.L.27
 P.Z.L. P.37 Łoś
 P.Z.L. P.42 Karaś
 P.Z.L. P.43 Karaś
 P.Z.L. P.38 Wilk
 P.Z.L.44 Wicher
 P.Z.L. P.45 Sokol
 P.Z.L. P.46 Sum
 P.Z.L. P.48 Lampart
 P.Z.L. P.49 Miś
 PZL.50 Jastrząb
 P.Z.L. P.62 (Dabrowski's fighter project)
 P.Z.L.-H

PZL-Krosno
 PZL Krosno KR-02 Krokodyl
 PZL Krosno KR-03 Puchatek

PZL Mielec 
 CSS-13
 PZL Szpak-4T
 PZL S-1	
 PZL S-4 Kania	
 PZL TS-8 Bies	
 PZL M2
 PZL M3 Pliszka
 PZL M7
 PZL M8 Pelikan
 PZL M4 Tarpan
 PZL An-2
 PZL Lim-1
 PZL Lim-2
 PZL Lim-5
 PZL Lim-6
 PZL TS-11 Iskra	
 PZL TS-16 Grot	
 PZL M12
 PZL M19
 PZL M14
 PZL M15 Belphegor
 PZL M16
 PZL M18 Dromader
 PZL M17
 PZL M20 Mewa
 PZL M19
 PZL M21 Dromader Mini
 PZL M24 Dromader Super
 PZL M25 Dromader Micro
 PZL M26 Iskierka	
 PZL An-28			
 PZL M28 Skytruck	
 PZL M30
 PZL M32
 PZL M34
 PZL I-22 Iryda	
 PZL S-70i Blackhawk

P.Z.L. Warszawa-Okęcie
(CSS -> WSK-Okęcie -> PZL "Warszawa-Okęcie" -> EADS PZL "Warszawa-Okęcie")
 PZL-101 Gawron
 PZL-102 Kos
 PZL-104 Wilga
 PZL-105 Flaming
 PZL-106 Kruk
 PZL-110 Koliber
 PZL-111 Koliber
 PZL-112 Koliber Junior
 PZL-112 Junior
 PZL-126 Mrówka
 PZL-130 Orlik
 PZL-230 Skorpion
 PZL TS-7 Chwat (TS - Tadeusza Sołtyka)
 PZL TS-8 Bies (TS - Tadeusza Sołtyka)
 PZL TS-9 Junak 3 (TS - Tadeusza Sołtyka)
 PZL TS-11 Iskra (TS - Tadeusza Sołtyka)
 PZL TS-15 Fregata (TS - Tadeusza Sołtyka)
 PZL TS-16 Grot (TS - Tadeusza Sołtyka)
 PZL TS-17 Pelikan (TS - Tadeusza Sołtyka)

PZL-Świdnik
 PZL-Swidnik BZ-1 Gil
 PZL-Swidnik BZ-4 Zuk
 PZL-Swidnik JK-1 Trzmiel
 PZL-Swidnik Kania
 PZL-Swidnik Mi-2
 PZL-Swidnik SM-1
 PZL-Swidnik SM-2
 PZL-Swidnik SM-4 Łątka
 PZL-Swidnik SW-4 Puszczyk
 PZL-Swidnik W-3 Sokół

SZD/P.Z.L.-Bielsko
 (Państwowe Zakłady Lotnicze - State Aviation Works)
 (Szybowcowym Zakladzie Doświadczalnym - gliding experimental department)
 SZD-45 Ogar (Bloodhound)
 PZL S-1 (S - Eugeniusz Stanikiewicz)
 PZL S-2 (S - Eugeniusz Stanikiewicz)
 PZL S-3 Kania (S - Eugeniusz Stanikiewicz)
 PZL S-4 Kania (S - Eugeniusz Stanikiewicz)

W.S.K. PZL Mielec
(Wytwórnia Sprzętu Komunikacyjnego - Communication Equipment Factory).
 PZL-Mielec M-1
 PZL-Mielec M-2
 PZL-Mielec M-3 Pliszka
 PZL-Mielec M-4 Tarpan
 PZL-Mielec M-15 Belphegor
 PZL-Mielec M-17
 PZL-Mielec M-18 Dromader
 PZL-Mielec M-20 Mewa
 PZL-Mielec M-21 Dromader Mini
 PZL-Mielec M-24 Dromader Super
 PZL-Mielec M-25 Dromader Mikro
 PZL-Mielec M26 Iskierka
 PZL-Mielec M28
 PZL MD-12

 PZL-Mielec Lala-1
 PZL-Mielec Lim-1
 PZL-Mielec Lim-2
 PZL-Mielec Lim-5
 PZL-Mielec Lim-6
 PZL-Mielec I-22 Iryda
 PZL-Mielec M93 Iryda
 PZL-Mielec M96 Iryda
 PZL M-1
 PZL M-5
 PZL M-7
 PZL M-9 Ziemowit
 PZL M-10
 PZL M-11
 PZL M-12
 PZL M-13
 PZL M-14
 PZL M-16 STN
 PZL M-19
 PZL M-32
 PZL M-34
 PZL M-95
 PZL M-97
 PZL M-99 Orkan

References

Further reading

External links

 List of aircraft (Pi - Pz)